The 2012 Saudi Crown Prince Cup Final was the 37th final of the Crown Prince Cup, a football tournament. It took place on 10 February 2012 at the King Fahd International Stadium in Riyadh, Saudi Arabia and was contested between Al-Hilal and Al-Ettifaq. It was Al-Hilal's 12th Crown Prince Cup final and Al-Ettifaq's fifth final. This was the second meeting between these two clubs in the final after 2008. It was Al-Ettifaq's first final since 2008 and Al-Hilal's fifth final in a row.

Al-Hilal won the match 2–1 to claim their eleventh Crown Prince Cup title and their fifth one in a row.

Teams

Venue

The King Fahd International Stadium was announced as the host of the final venue. This was the eleventh Crown Prince Cup final hosted in the King Fahd International Stadium following those in 1992, 1994, 1998, 2003, 2004, 2005, 2006, 2008, 2009 and 2010.

The King Fahd International Stadium was built in 1982 and was opened in 1987. The stadium was used as a venue for the 1992, 1995, and the 1997 editions of the FIFA Confederations Cup. Its current capacity is 68,752 and it is used by the Saudi Arabia national football team, Al-Nassr, Al-Shabab, and major domestic matches.

Background
Al-Hilal reached their twelfth final after a 2–0 win against Al-Ittihad. This was Al-Hilal's fifth final in a row.

Al-Ettifaq reached their fifth final, after a 2–1 away win against Al-Ahli. They reached their first final since 2008 when they finished as runners-up after losing to Al-Hilal.

This was the second meeting between these two sides in the Crown Prince Cup final. Al-Hilal won the previous meeting 2–0 in the 2008 final. The two teams played each other once in the season prior to the final. The match ended in a 2–2 draw.

Road to the final 

Key: (H) = Home; (A) = Away

Match

Details